Edward Norman Trevelyan (born August 14, 1955) is an American sailor and Olympic champion.

Trevelyan, a member of a team that also included skipper Bob Haines and Rod Davis, received a gold medal in the Soling class at the 1984 Summer Olympics in Los Angeles.

References

External links

1955 births
Living people
American male sailors (sport)
Medalists at the 1984 Summer Olympics
North American Champions Soling
Olympic gold medalists for the United States in sailing
People from San Pedro, Los Angeles
Sailors at the 1984 Summer Olympics – Soling
San Diego Yacht Club sailors
Soling class world champions